There are a number of traditional martial arts native to Ireland. The Irish language term for "martial arts" is ealaíona comhraic.
Traditional styles include Dornálaíocht (boxing), Coraíocht (wrestling), Speachóireacht (kicking), and Bataireacht (stick-fighting).

Boxing 

Dornálaíocht is the Irish word for boxing, dorn meaning fist.

The Irish are well known for their bare-knuckle boxing style. Dornálaíocht's stance is often reflected in Irish caricatures such as that of the Notre Dame Leprechaun. The lead hand stays at a greater distance from the body than done in modern boxing. The lead arm's shoulder stays tight against the jaw while the other arm is tucked tightly to the body, using its fist to guard the jaw. This is due to the bare-knuckle nature of the style. 

Without large boxing gloves, it is not recommended to tuck and cover up from a punch. Instead, the lead hand is used to block the incoming attack while side stepping and back stepping to create an angle or swaying the torso away from or towards the opponent. The more distantly placed lead hand is also used to more easily obtain a single collar clinch, so that another valued aspect of Dornálaíocht can then be employed: dirty boxing. In Irish martial arts, dirty boxing is very effective for striking but is also used to set up many grappling-based attacks from collar-and-elbow. In Irish-American schools, Dornálaíocht is sometimes referred to as "Irish Boxing", "Irish Scrapping", or "Scrapping".

Radio Telefís Éireann's Prime Time, which discusses Irish related social and political problems, had an hour-long documentary on the Irish Travellers and also their bare knuckle boxing heritage.

Wrestling 

Coraíocht is the Irish word for wrestling. Ireland has its own form of wrestling, notably collar and elbow wrestling. Coraíocht is also the name of a back hold style of wrestling practised in Ireland. Coraíocht can be practised with or without a jacket and features a wide array of trips, mares, takedowns, slams, pins, advancements, submissions, grapevines, and escapes. The most quoted "modern" way of describing the philosophy behind Coraíocht is "use balance and speed to obtain position so that strength can then be applied to the leverage created". In Irish-American–based systems, Coraíocht is sometimes referred to as "Irish Wrestling", "Celtic Wrestling", "Irish Scuffling", "Scuffling", and "Collar-and-Elbow".

Famous Irish wrestlers include Danno O'Mahony of Cork (former world champion), Steve Casey of Kerry (former world champion), and Con O'Kelly, who competed for Britain in the 1908 Summer Olympics. Famous Irish-American wrestlers include Henry Moses Dufur and John McMahon.

Stick fighting 

Bataireacht is the traditional art of the Irish shillelagh, which is still identified with popular Irish culture to this day, although the arts of Bataireacht are much less so. The sticks used for Bataireacht are not of a standardised size, as there are various styles of Bataireacht, using various kinds of sticks. The most preferred of these kinds is a branch or walking stick.

By the 18th century, Bataireacht became increasingly associated with Irish gangs called "factions". Irish faction fights involved large groups of Irish men (and sometimes women) who would engage in melees at county fairs, weddings, funerals, or any other convenient gathering. However, most historians (best summarised by James S. Donnelly, Jr. (1983) in "Irish Peasants: Violence & Political Unrest, 1780") agree that faction fighting had class and political overtones, as depicted for example in the works of William Carleton.

By the early 19th century, these gangs had organised into larger regional federations, which coalesced from the old Whiteboys into the Caravat and Shanavest factions. Beginning first in Munster, the Caravat and Shanavest "war" erupted sporadically throughout the 19th century and caused some serious disturbances. Over time, traditional rules and methods of Bataireacht and Shillelagh Law degenerated into more murderous fighting involving farm implements and guns.

As the push for Irish independence from Great Britain gained traction toward the end of the 18th century (see Irish Rebellion of 1798), leaders of the Irish community believed it was necessary to distance themselves from customs associated with factionism and division, to present a united military front to the British, hence the United Irishmen of the Republican movement. Foremost of these customs were the arts of Bataireacht, and the shillelagh was soon replaced with the gun of the new unified faction of the Fenian Movement.

References

Further reading 
 Carleton, William. Traits and Stories of Irish Peasantry (Five volumes, published between 1833 and c. 1853)

External links 
Celtic Martial Arts Research Society
Shillelagh Irish Stick-fighting

European martial arts
Sports originating in Ireland